Coming Alive is the first studio album from Christian singer-songwriter Casey Darnell. It was released on June 21, 2011, by North Point Music. The producer on the album was Steve Fee. This album saw commercial charting successes.

Critical reception

At Cross Rhythms, Stephen Luff rated the album nine out of ten, noting how "Casey has managed here what other artists strive to achieve, a way to communicate worship in a relevant, current style, with lyrics that worship God while speaking into the life of the listener." Also, Luff finishing with writing "Recommended."

Commercial performance
For the Billboard charting week of July 9, 2011, Coming Alive was the No. 39 most sold album in the Christian music market via the Christian Albums placement, and it was the No. 48 most sold album on the breaking and entry chart of the Heatseekers Albums.

Track listing

Charts

References

2011 debut albums